Richard Hartley was a college football player. Hartley starred as a halfback for the Georgia Bulldogs in 1920 and 1921. As a member of 1920's "Ten Second Backfield," Hartley ran for 170 yards and two touchdowns in a minute and twenty seconds against South Carolina in 1920. In 1921, he scored on Harvard, and he fumbled twice against Dartmouth.

References

American football halfbacks
Georgia Bulldogs football players
People from Fort Valley, Georgia
Players of American football from Georgia (U.S. state)